Hendrik Pfeiffer (born 18 March 1993) is a German long distance runner who competed at the 2020 Summer Games in the marathon.

Pfeiffer ran at the 2016 European Athletics Championships in Amsterdam but failed to finish the race as he had a heel injury. The heel injury also kept him out of the  2016 Summer Games. He was again selected for the 2018 European Athletics Championships but had to pull out due to injury problems.

He won the 2017 Cologne Marathon and at the Vivawest Marathon in Gelsenkirchen in 2018 Pfeiffer set a new world record for the fastest half marathon ever run in a suit. He ran it in 1:12.47 breaking the record by over five minutes. Pfeiffer was motivated to highlight the dual roles many athletes have to play of athlete and worker. Pfeiffer himself at the time was studying journalism at the Technical University of Dortmund, and was a student trainee in the corporate communications department at a steel trader in Duisburg.

Pfeiffer caught COVID-19 and his training was interrupted but he was still selected to compete at the delayed 2020 Summer Games. On 23 February 2020 he had run 2:10.18 at the Seville Marathon to meet the qualifying standard.

References

External links
 

1993 births
Living people
German male long-distance runners
German male marathon runners
Athletes (track and field) at the 2020 Summer Olympics
Olympic athletes of Germany
Sportspeople from Düsseldorf
21st-century German people